Dell XPS ("eXtreme Performance System") is a line of consumer-oriented high-end laptop and desktop computers manufactured by Dell. The XPS mainly competes against computers such as Acer's Aspire, HP's Pavilion and Envy, Lenovo's X1, Samsung's Sens, and Apple MacBook Pro.

History 
The XPS name dates back to 1990 when Dell was more focused on corporate business than consumers. Gateway (then known as Gateway 2000) was the number one in the high-end consumer market. In early 1993, there was a staff meeting to address how to pursue this emerging market. At this time, Dell's annual revenue was less than $500 million and Michael Dell was involved in most decisions. At this meeting, it was decided to launch a new high-end product line to compete with Gateway. Vernon Weiss was assigned as product manager to spearhead and manage the marketing of the new product. He worked with Brian Zucker who led the architecture and engineering effort.

In September 1993, the first two versions of the XPS line were announced, initially as part of the Dell Dimension series. The first generation of the XPS system was available as either a desktop or a tower case. This new product line was so far ahead of the competition that it was featured on the cover of the October 1993 issue of PC/Computing.

For the next three years, with Weiss and Zucker continuing to evolve the product line, the XPS systems beat the competition in over 100 magazine reviews and covers, being the first to adopt the latest PC technology available and bring it to the consumers at an attractive price.

From 1997 to 2001, as Dell grew into a large corporation, the XPS systems lost its position as the leading-edge performance machines as more high-end computers with the latest performing hardware started to appear from other manufacturers, with the XPS essentially relegated into just a line for fast computers.

In 2005, Dell revamped the XPS line to compete with Alienware (now owned by Dell) and Falcon Northwest. Dell had considered buying Alienware from 2002, but did not take any action until March 22, 2006 when they purchased the company. Alienware maintained its autonomy in terms of design and marketing. However, Alienware's access to Dell's supply chain management, purchasing power, and economies of scale lowered its operating costs. The revamped XPS line initially had the same specifications as those offered by the Alienware division. Also in 2005, Dell separated its home desktop systems into two lines: Dell Dimension and XPS. Consumer notebooks were also separated into two lines: Dell Inspiron and XPS.

In 2008, Dell introduced "Studio XPS" and Dell advertised it as a performance computer line while Alienware was being advertised for gaming. On June 2, 2009, The M17x was introduced as the First Alienware/Dell branded system.

Desktops

XPS Tower 8000 series

XPS Tower (8950) 
The 2022 Dell XPS 8950 features Intel's 12th-generation i3, i5/i5K, i7/i7K/i7F/i7KF, and i9/i9K/i9KF CPUs.

XPS Tower (8940) 
The 2020 Dell XPS 8940 features Intel's 10th and 11th-generation i3, i5, i7, and i9 CPUs.

XPS Tower (8930) 
The 2017 Dell XPS 8930 features Intel's 8th-generation i5 and i7 CPUs on an LGA 1151 socket.

XPS Tower (8910) 
Dell XPS Towers were released in July 2016. Three systems were introduced: the XPS Tower, XPS Tower VR, and the XPS Tower Special Edition. All systems are introduced with 6th-generation (Skylake) i5 and i7 CPUs, at least 8 GiB of DDR4 memory, and are designed with an easy to open chassis for simple expandability One of the main differences from the 8900 is that now the m.2 connector supports 4 PCI-E lanes instead of 1. The VR and Special Edition meet and exceed the minimum recommended specifications for running virtual reality and the Special Edition passed testing for the Oculus Ready and HTC Vive Optimized certification programs.

XPS 8900 
The Dell XPS 8900 was released in October 2015. It is designed for moderate to heavy gaming and high-end workstation performance.  It features Intel's 6th-generation (Skylake) i5 and i7 CPUs on an LGA 1151 socket. It also includes an upgrade to higher-bandwidth DDR4 memory.

XPS 8700 
The Dell XPS 8700 was released in 2013. It was designed for moderate to heavy gaming and high-end workstation performance. It features a Dell 0KWVT8 motherboard with an LGA-1150 socket. It comes with a quad-core Intel Core i7 processor and an Nvidia Geforce GTX 660. A special edition is available with an AMD Radeon R9 270.

System specifications 
Memory:
 Type: unbuffered, non-ECC, dual-channel DDR3 (Up to 1600 MHz)
 Maximum: 32 GiB, with 2, 4 or 8 GiB in base

Video:
 Integrated: Intel HD Graphics 4600 (Up to 1.7 GiB system)
 Additional:
 Nvidia Geforce GTX 660  (1.5 GiB GDDR5)
 AMD Radeon R9 270 (2 GiB GDDR5)

Communications:
 Network Adapter: 10/100/1000 Mbit/s integrated network card
 Wireless: Wi-Fi 802.11 b/g/n and Bluetooth 4.0
WLAN options (The DW1520 card, and the DW1501 card are IEEE 802.11n certified):
Chip: Broadcom BCM4313 (b/g/n (2.4 GHz) 150 Mbit/s) + FCC ID: QDS-BRCM10 50 + "Dell Wireless 1501 WLAN Half Mini-Card"
Chip: Broadcom BCM4322 (a/b/g/n-draft (2.4 or 5 GHz) 300 Mbit/s) + FCC ID: QDS-BRCM10 31 + "Dell Wireless 1510 Wireless-N WLAN Mini-Card"
Chip: Broadcom BCM43224 (a/b/g/n (2.4 or 5 GHz) 300 Mbit/s) + FCC ID: QDS-BRCM10 41 + "Dell Wireless 1520 Wireless-N WLAN Mini-Card"

Motherboard:
 Dell 0KWVT8

CPU:
 Intel Core i7 4790 (8 MiB L3 Cache;3.6 GHz Base Clock, Turbo to 4.0 GHz)
 Integrated Graphics — Intel HD 4600

XPS 8500 
Released on May 2, 2012, the Dell XPS 8500 is the first version in this series to have the third-generation (Ivy Bridge) Intel Quad Core i5 and i7 processor added to it. This version of the XPS's motherboard uses the Intel Chipset H77 with socket LGA 1155 and has USB 3.0 ports built into the front. The "Special Edition" version of this desktop, (starting price $999 as of Jan '13), comes standard with such advanced features as an Intel Core i7, Blu-ray drive and a 32 GiB Intel mSATA SSD mounted on the motherboard to enhance the operational speed of the traditional hard disk.

System specifications 
Memory:
 Type: unbuffered, non-ECC, quad-channel DDR3 (Up to 1600 MHz)
 Maximum: 32 GiB, with 2/4/8 GiB in base

Video:
 Integrated: Intel HD Graphics 2500/4000 (Up to 1 GiB system)
 Additional:
 Nvidia Geforce GT 620 – 1 GiB GDDR5
 Nvidia Geforce GT 640 – 1 GiB GDDR5
 Nvidia Geforce GTX 660 – 1.5 GiB GDDR5
 AMD Radeon HD 7570 – 1 GiB GDDR5
 AMD Radeon HD 7770 – 2 GiB GDDR5
 AMD Radeon HD 7870 – 2 GiB GDDR5

Communications:
 Network Adapter: 10/100/1000 Mbit/s integrated network card
 Wireless: Wi-Fi 802.11 b/g/n; Bluetooth 4.0

XPS 8300 
This series uses Intel H67 socket 1155 Sandy bridge CPU's, such as i5-2320 and i7-2600K.

Motherboard:
Dell 0Y2MRG (DH67M01 TB0420)

Memory:
 Type: unbuffered, non-ECC, quad-channel DDR3
 Maximum: 32 GiB, with 2/4/8 GiB in base

WLAN options (The DW1520 card, and the DW1501 card are IEEE 802.11n certified):
Chip: Broadcom BCM4313 (b/g/n (2.4 GHz) 150 Mbit/s) + FCC ID: QDS-BRCM10 50 + "Dell Wireless 1501 WLAN Half Mini-Card"
Chip: Broadcom BCM4322 (a/b/g/n-draft (2.4 or 5 GHz) 300 Mbit/s) + FCC ID: QDS-BRCM10 31 + "Dell Wireless 1510 Wireless-N WLAN Mini-Card"
Chip: Broadcom BCM43224 (a/b/g/n (2.4 or 5 GHz) 300 Mbit/s) + FCC ID: QDS-BRCM10 41 + "Dell Wireless 1520 Wireless-N WLAN Mini-Card"

XPS 8100 
Released in 2010, the Dell Studio XPS 8100 was a mid-range, all-purpose PC aimed at home users. It had a Core i5-650 processor, 4 GiB of DDR3 RAM, 1 TB of hard drive space and an NVIDIA GTS 240 graphics card as standard.

XPS One 27" 
The Dell XPS One 27" is an all-in-one PC that, hence its name, features a 27-inch screen with a resolution of 2560 pixels wide and a height of 1440 pixels. It is the recipient of CNET's 2012 Editor's Choice Award, and it was also awarded as PCMag's best all-in-one PC of 2012.

CNET editor Rich Brown, who authored the review awarding the XPS One 27" the Editor's Choice Award, noted that it "boasts the highest-display resolution among Windows 8 all-in-ones, and at an aggressive price."

On its page discussing PCMag's selections for the best products of the year, it said that the all-in-one "manages to put almost every technology and feature we're looking for in a compact stylish chassis."

There are reports from many buyers complaining of a quality control issue on the screen. There are dust particles trapped between the screen and the touch panel. Some buyers even received several exchanges or screens replacements and the issue still remains. Some people may not notice but turning the brightness up will show these spots. They look like dead pixels.

Studio XPS 
The Studio XPS, also referred to as Studio XPS 435MT, was released November 16, 2008. This is a PC with performance somewhat between the XPS 420 and 630. Its processor is the Intel Core i7. The current Studio XPS models, however, are not as gamer-oriented, with only one PCIe x16 slot and a 475 watt power supply. It has RAID0/1 support, however, as well as the capability of up to 24 GB of RAM. Later this model was renamed to the Studio XPS 9000, later succeeded by a newer version, the Studio XPS 9100.

XPS One 20 and XPS One 24 
Released on November 19, 2007, the Dell XPS One is an all-in-one desktop designed for "minimal fuss and maximum cordless connectivity", and ships with the power cord, and a wireless keyboard with a touchpad and wireless mouse prepared to the system. The XPS One comes in 20-inch (XPS One 20) and 24-inch (XPS One 24) models. The 20-inch model has an Intel Core 2 Duo E4500, while the 24-inch model has an Intel Core 2 Quad Q8200. The 20-inch model has 2 GB of dual-channel DDR2 SDRAM @ 667 MHz, while the 24-inch model has 4 GB of dual-channel DDR2 SDRAM @ 800 MHz. The XPS One 20 has integrated Intel GMA 3100 graphics, while the XPS One 24 has integrated Intel GMA X4500HD graphics, and can be customized with an nVidia GeForce 9600M GT graphics card when chosen with PRODUCT (RED). The XPS One 20 has a WSXGA (1680×1050) resolution with 16.7 million colors, a 1000:1 contrast ratio, an 80° viewing angle, and a 5 ms response time. The XPS One 24 has a WUXGA (1900×1200) resolution with 16.7 million colors, a 1200:1 contrast ratio, an 89° viewing angle, and a 6 ms response time. The 20-inch model has integrated High Definition Audio and 10 watt stereo speakers, while the 24-inch model has SoundBlaster Audigy HD software with 25 watt premium JBL speakers with an integrated subwoofer. The XPS One 20 and XPS One 24 were subsequently discontinued by Dell.

XPS 18 
The Dell XPS 18 was announced in April 2013. It is an all-in-one computer that also functions as a large tablet. It has a screen size of 18.4 inches.

XPS H Series 
A system that came out circa 1996/97. It contained an Intel Pentium II (Klamath) CPU, EDO DRAM, and an i440FX chipset.

XPS D series 
A system that came out in 1997. It contained an Intel Pentium II (Klamath) CPU, SDRAM, and an i440LX chipset.

XPS R series 
A system that was introduced in 1998. It contained an Intel Pentium II (Deschutes) CPU, SDRAM, and an i440BX chipset.

XPS T series 
A system that was introduced in 1999. It contained an Intel Pentium III CPU, SDRAM, and an i440BX chipset. An "r" suffix was used for Socket 370 versions, while no suffix was used for Slot 1 versions.

XPS B series 
A system that was introduced in 2000. It contained an Intel Pentium III CPU, 128 MB of RDRAM, an ATi RAGE graphics card, and an i820 chipset. An "r" suffix was used for Socket 370 versions, while no suffix was used for Slot 1 versions. Later models (especially the "R" series) had a built in DVD drive.

XPS Gen 2 
Included Pentium 4 processor with Hyper-Threading Technology (3.4 GHz, 800 MHz Bus, Microsoft Windows XP Professional, 400 MHz dual-channel DDR SDRAM (400 MHz), Supports SATA and IDE hard drives, 1 AGP Slot, 4 PCI slots, Sound Blaster Audigy², and Dell Wireless Keyboard and Mouse. Video Card included was ATI Radeon 9800 Pro (AGP x8).

It was powered by a 460 watt proprietary power supply and featured decorative LEDs on the front of the case that the user could change the colors of in the BIOS.

XPS Gen 3 
Base configuration had a Pentium 4 processor at a speed of 3.0 GHz or higher, 512 MiB of DDR, 400 MHz memory, a single 80 GB 7200 RPM hard drive, an ATI Radeon X800 XT graphics card, and a Sound Blaster Audigy² audio card. It came pre-installed with Windows XP Home Edition.

XPS Gen 4 
Base configuration had a Pentium 4 processor at a speed of 3.0 GHz or higher, 512 MiB of DDR2, 533 MHz memory, a single 160 GB 7200 RPM hard drive, an NVIDIA GeForce 6800 graphics card, and a Sound Blaster Audigy² audio card. It came pre-installed with Windows XP Home Edition.

XPS Gen 5 
Used a Pentium 4 HT processor with 512 KiB, 1 MiB, or 2 MiB of L2 Cache. It can support up to 8 GiB of DDR2 memory @ 533 MHz or 667 MHz.

XPS 200 series

XPS 200 
This model was available from late 2005 to the end of the third quarter of 2006. It was replaced by the XPS 210, which is nearly identical to its predecessor. The main exception in this case is the upgrade to an Intel Core 2 Duo processor and other minor adjustments.

XPS 210 
A small-form-factor case that is 67% smaller than the XPS 410. It does not use full-size PCI slots. The XPS 200 is aimed at being a low-impact machine, meaning it blends in better with the room's features. It is more of a multimedia computer than an actual gaming machine, despite the XPS name. The main difference between the XPS 210 and its predecessor, the XPS 200, is the upgrade to the Intel Core 2 Duo processor line. This makes the XPS 210 faster than the XPS 200.

XPS 400 series

XPS 400 
This model was available during late 2005 and the first half of 2006. It was replaced by the XPS 410, which is nearly identical with the exception of an optional Intel Core 2 Duo processor and slightly different audio and video card options

XPS 410 
The former intermediate model of the XPS series and bigger brother to the Dimension E520. It features a base configuration of an Intel Core 2 Duo processor, and a 2.4 GHz Core 2 Quad is also available as an option. Other base options include the Nvidia GeForce 7300LE, 7200RPM SATA-300 hard drive, and dual-channel DDR2 RAM. The case is nearly identical to that of the Dimension E520, with an additional 3.5-inch drive bay being added. The case is physically taller because of this. The power supply is also slightly more powerful than the Dimension E520 (375 W vs 305 W, respectively and has an added 6 pin PCIe power cable). The XPS 410 replaced the XPS 400. It was replaced by the XPS 420. XPS 410 units were also sold as the Dimension 9200, allowing Dell to continue selling remaining units after the XPS 410 was discontinued.

In an odd twist, the Dimension 9200 was the final desktop in the Dimension line, effectively making an XPS unit the last in the Dimension family.

XPS 420 
Now discontinued, it features similar components to the XPS 410, but it used different case design and new features. This was Dell's media based computer featuring the Dell Xcelerator (a simple and effective Video Recorder), and an LCD screen in the case, running Windows Vista SideShow. As usual with the 4XX Line of XPS's, it did not allow for SLI Graphics. The XPS 420 added support for 45 nm Core2 Duo/Quad/ and Extreme CPUs up to the QX9650.

XPS 430 
Similar to 420, with DDR3 RAM and without the LCD on the computer chassis.

Studio XPS 435T (or Studio XPS 9000/9100), Studio XPS 435MT 
The Dell XPS 435T was a mid-tower desktop that originally shipped with a Nehalem-based Intel Core i7 processor.  The system's motherboard used Intel's X58 chipset, allowing for 3 memory channels over 6 available DIMM slots.  The XPS 435T is able to support Westmere-based Core i7 and Xeon processors (supporting up to 6 cores) with the latest BIOS update.

The XPS435MT was a smaller Mini Tower version that shared the X58 chipset. Unlike the 435T, the 435MT's BIOS was never updated to support Westmere-based Core i7 or Xeon chips.  The motherboard is a variation of the MSI 7591 MicroATX.

XPS 600 series

XPS 600 
The former flagship model of the XPS series that features an Intel dual-core Pentium D 950 processor, dual Nvidia GeForce 7900GTX in SLI mode, 7200 RPM SATA hard drive, and dual-channel DDR2 RAM. This case has not changed significantly over the past several generations, with the large aluminum plate on the front. Discontinued a few days after XPS 700 launch and succeeded by the XPS 700.

XPS 625 
A version of the XPS 630 but with AMD Phenom II chips and ATI Graphics.

XPS 630 
This 2008's desktop at one time filled the gap between the media-oriented XPS 420/430 and the high-end XPS 730x. There is no physical difference(s) between the 630 and the 630i. The marketing concept was to use an "i" to designate systems installed with an Intel chipset, and an "a" for systems with AMD-installed chipsets, but since Intel-based chipsets were the only models ever sold, this designation holds little significance. The 630 features a Dell-modified Nvidia nForce 650i chipset that supports both SLI and CrossFire configurations, but lacks ESA certification (the only ESA-certified component in the 630i is Dell's "Master Input/Output" (or "MIO") printed circuit board). The XPS 630 at one time came standard with an Intel Core 2 Quad Q6600 CPU and dual Nvidia GeForce 8800GT graphics cards.

Problems and solutions 
There were several issues with the XPS 630 including problems with the chassis fan control, chassis LED lights, and non-shipment of the LightFX 2.0 lightshow control software. limited PCIe slot configuration (8,8,1,1 unlike OEM Nvidia 650i SLI motherboards which also offer the 16,1,1,1 configuration), constant HDD LED activity, and a reliability issue due to a problem inherent in the Nvidia 650i SLI chipset that can surface when overclocking with 4 or more gigabytes of RAM. The problems resulted in PC PRO revoking their Recommended award for the system.

The July 22, 2009 release of a Softex Media Plug-in has provided some of the features originally advertised in LightFX. BIOS updates were issued to patch the constant HDD LED activity. Some 630i owners have bypassed the aforementioned problems by swapping out the Dell-modified 650i motherboard with OEM motherboards such as the EVGA nForce 780i SLI FTW. The motherboard has 8 lanes wired for each PCIe slot, which can restrict performance if using a single high-performance graphics card. Performance is equivalent to other systems with 650i chipset motherboards when using two graphics cards in SLI mode.

XPS 700 series

XPS 700 
Targeted at the gaming community, this model featured the Intel Pentium D Extreme processors in speeds up to 3.7 GHz with dual nVidia GeForce 7900 GTX in SLI mode, a 7200RPM SATA hard drive and dual-channel DDR2 RAM. This desktop was advertised as being overclockable but was not. Dell would later offer a free XPS 720 motherboard upgrade program to all XPS 700 and 710 owners so that these machines could be overclocked with the bios. The aluminum case featured a distinctive "leaning" design. The XPS 700 used significantly larger power supplies (750 watt and 1 kilowatt) than the other XPS models to accommodate higher-end video cards and overclocked CPUs. Unlike its forerunners, it used a BTX motherboard, thereby limiting upgradability. It was replaced by the XPS 710 and many customers were offered a free motherboard upgrade to XPS 720 specification following complaints about the system.

XPS 710 
The formal flagship model of the XPS series that features the new Intel Core 2 Duo and Core 2 Extreme processors, as well as Core 2 Quad processors. Other features include dual nVidia GeForce 7950 GX2 in Quad SLI mode, 7200RPM SATA hard drive, dual-channel DDR2 RAM. The XPS 710 uses significantly larger power supplies than the other XPS models to accommodate higher-end video cards and overclocked CPUs. It was replaced by the XPS 720.

XPS 720, XPS 720 H2C 
Announced on November 24, 2007, the XPS 720 is the same as the XPS 720 H2C, except it does not have the "dual-stage radiator cooling technology." It comes in two versions, the Red Special Edition, which is the same as the Black normal one, they both come with a 1 kW power supply.

The H2C edition computer has included a dual-stage radiator cooling technology, and a motherboard capable of overclocking its quad core Intel Core 2 Extreme QX6800. The H2C comes standard with dual Nvidia GeForce 8800GTX cards running in SLI at a price of $6,780. The XPS 720 H2C uses slightly higher quality parts than other XPS classes. At the time it was one of the most powerful and fastest pre-built systems an individual could purchase by a significant margin.

XPS 730 H2C 
The 730 H2C had H2C (a high-performance cooling system) as standard, which was ideal for gaming and overclocking. Its motherboard, the Nvidia nForce 790i Ultra, was capable of overclocking its quad core Intel Core 2 Extreme QX9770 up to 3.64 GHz. Dual channel DDR3 SDRAM system memory was available in United States and UK. There was a choice of colors also at some outlets. The basic model specs of the PC were: Intel Core 2 Extreme Processor QX9650 (3.46 GHz Overclocked), DUAL 1 GiB ATI Radeon 3870 X2 Crossfire X Graphics Card, 2 GiB Memory, 1 TB 7200rpm Dual HDD. The base price in the UK was £2,499. The system also came with an improved H2C cooling device, seen on ultra high gaming computers. This has since been replaced by the XPS 730x (see above).

XPS 730X, XPS 730X H2C 
Released on November 16, 2008, the XPS 730X is essentially an XPS 730 with the new Intel Core i7 which also used the new Intel X58 chipset Motherboards.
The XPS 730X H2C was the higher-end version of the 730X that made use of H2Ceramic cooling and often shipped with factory-overclocked Core i7 Extreme Edition processors.
The 730X also integrates Alienware's AlienFX and a new theatre lighting system. The internals of the 730X have also been redone for ease of upgrades, although most of the inside remains the same. The 730X supported a Tri-Channel of 6 GB of DDR3. The graphics card support was either a dual or single NVIDIA Geforce GTX 285, or a single ATI Radeon HD 4870 X2. The 730X originally shipped with Windows Vista, but eventually offered Windows 7 near the end of its availability. 
Dell internally discontinued the XPS 730X and XPS 730X H2C in its US online store on August 1, 2009 and cancelled any remaining orders after August 15, 2009. It has been mentioned that this was done to focus more attention for customers seeking gaming computers, such as Alienware. The desktop was officially discontinued on September 17, 2009 (see Dell XPS 730x).

Laptops 

Dell returned to develop their XPS performance line. The three new laptops, released in October 2010, have many new features and specifications from the old models. They feature JBL speakers with Waves MaxxAudio 3 technology, and have integrated 3D graphics. The line is the first to be Skype-certified for video chat. They have Intel i5 and i7 processors. The X-Fi upgrade offered by Dell is not actually a hardware upgrade but a software-based processing package which "provides premium audio quality, effects and features".

XPS 11

XPS 11 (9P33) 
Dell announced the XPS 11 in June 2013. It features an 11.6-inch screen that can be folded backwards almost 360 degrees to act as a tablet. It shipped with Windows 8.1 and a "Haswell" Intel Core i5 processor.

XPS 12

XPS 12 (9Q23) 

The XPS 12 is a convertible laptop. The convertible mirrors the general aesthetic of the Dell XPS 13 ultrabook and other models in the XPS lineup, although the hybrid swaps out its predecessors' aluminum look for a carbon-fiber exterior. The lid and exterior edge are framed by a machined aluminum edge, while the interior consists of a magnesium-alloy palm rest coated in matte black paint. The Dell XPS 12's body was made with a fingerprint-resisting coating. It possesses a hinged, flip-screen LCD. Applying a push to the top of the screen frees the 12.5 inches, 1920×1080 resolution, 400-nit brightness display from the magnetic locks that hold it in place. The convertible's 1.7 GHz Core i5-3317U processor sports Intel HD Graphics 4000 integrated graphics, which combine with 4 GiB of RAM and a 128 GB solid-state drive and Core i5 processor, but ups the memory to 8 GiB and the storage to 256 GB. Some models configuration includes the Core i7 processor, 8 GiB of RAM, and the 256 GB SSD.

XPS 12 (9Q33) 
In July 2013, Dell released its XPS 12 with Intel Haswell (4th Generation) processor. This upgrade came as a boost in the Ultrabook's performance as well as battery life. Dell also added near field communication in this device.

XPS 12 (9250) 
In 2015, Dell released a new XPS 12 with Intel Skylake Core M processors. The hinge system was removed and replaced with a fully detachable display. The device has a 4K Ultra HD (3860×2160) display, a kickstand and an 8MP rear camera and a 5MP front camera. The new XPS 12 has an all-metal build from the new XPS 13.

XPS 13

XPS 13 (L321X, Early 2012) 
The Dell XPS 13 was unveiled at CES 2012. It is the company's first Ultrabook, a term coined by Intel. The XPS 13 features a 13.3-inch screen (1366×768 Non-Touch Corning Gorilla Glass) and uses flash memory to help with fast booting. The XPS 13 features certain unique design elements. The edges are rounded and the bottom is made of carbon fibre, with a gentle silicone surface treatment. A battery level indicator was also present, and is functional when powered off. Note: Intel Chipset is 2nd generation I series.

Dell also offers a developer's version of the XPS 13 running Ubuntu Linux.

XPS 13 (L322X, Early 2013) 
The slightly heavier, revised version of L321X. Difference with the previous version include: 4-8 DDR3L RAM, up to 1600 MHz, Mobile Intel 7 series express chipset QS77 (Panther Point, 3rd generation I series), Intel HD 4000 graphics instead of 3000, two USB 3.0 ports, an upgraded wireless card, and a 13.3-inch HD WLED, HD/FHD TrueLife with Gorilla glass LCD.

XPS 13 (9333, Late 2013) 
Released in 2013. Includes a 13.3" LED backlit touch screen display with 1920×1080 resolution and Corning Gorilla Glass, Intel Core fourth generation i5-4200U or i7-4500U processor (with integrated chipset and Intel HD 4400 Graphics), Windows 8.1 (64-bit), 4 or 8 GiB Dual Channel DDR3 1600 MHz RAM, 128 or 256 GB mSATA SSD, Intel Dual Band Wireless-AC 7260 + Bluetooth wireless, and 55 WHr 6-Cell Battery. However, Dell has not fixed the issue with this generation – a high pitched noise emitting from the keyboard area to the right.

XPS 13 (9343, Early 2015) 
Announced at CES and released in January 2015, the latest XPS 13 comes with the new Intel Broadwell processors and a renovated 3200×1800 touchscreen of 13.3" set in a very thin frame, and claims up to 15 hours of battery life and many other upgrades on the previous model.

XPS 13 (9350, Late 2015) 

Released in October 2015, the 9350 is similar to the 9343 but with the new Intel Skylake processor (6th generation I series) and a Thunderbolt 3 (with USB 3.1 Gen 2 support) in lieu of the mini-DisplayPort. There was also another model with i7-6560 CPU and Iris 540 graphics released later for better graphics performance. One of the biggest improvements was an increase in available integrated RAM memory to 16 GiB DDR3L (in highest versions). It was criticized for the placement of the webcam in the bottom bezel.

XPS 13 (9360, Late 2016 and Late 2017) 
Released in October 2016, the 9360 is similar to the 9350 but with the new Intel Kaby Lake processor (7th generation U series) or, in some models from late 2017 onwards, Intel's 8th generation (Kaby Lake-R) U series processors. The XPS 13 Developer Edition comes preloaded with Ubuntu 18.04 LTS.

XPS 13 2-in-1 (9365, Early 2017) 

The 9365 is similar to the late 2016 XPS 13 (9360) but with a flexible hinge allowing it to fold over into tablet mode.
The laptop also features face recognition to login.

XPS 13 (9370, Early 2018) 

Released in January 2018, the 9370 has an entirely new design refresh, with a smaller footprint and lighter chassis. The battery capacity dropped from 60 watt-hours to 52 watt-hours, most likely due to the smaller form factor. This refresh has Intel's 8th generation Core processors (Kaby Lake R), and starts at $USD999, $USD200 more than the 9360. The Intel 8th generation processors used in this version meets the requirements for upgrading to Windows 11. Dell has dropped the barrel-style connector, previously used to charge the device, as well as USB-A ports. The 9370 now includes two Thunderbolt 3, a microSD card reader, one USB-C port and one headphone jack. Dell is also offering a model in white, which uses a different palm rest material than the previous carbon fiber palm rest and deck on the 9360.

XPS 13 (9380, Early 2019) 
Released in January 2019, the 9380 has the webcam back at the top of its monitor. Dell again includes two Thunderbolt 3, a micro SD card reader, one USB-C port and one headphone jack. This refresh has Intel's 8th generation Core i3-8145U, i5-8265U, and Core i7-8565U processors, codenamed Whiskey Lake. The base i3 model starts at $949 (USD) but with only 4 GB of RAM, and goes up all the way to $1,659 (USD) with the i7 model.

XPS 13 2-in-1 (7390, Mid 2019) 
The XPS-13 2-in-1 is one of the first in the line-up to be offered with a 10th generation 10 nm Intel Ice Lake processor with Intel Iris Plus integrated graphics. It has a new 13.4 inch screen with aspect ratio of 16:10, and was launched in August 2019. This model has a soldered SSD which cannot be upgraded, and unlike the 2017 model which is silent and fanless, this model does have two fans for active cooling.

XPS 13 (7390, Late 2019) 

Following the launch of the XPS 13 2-in-1, the refreshed XPS was offered with a new 10th generation 14 nm Comet Lake processor up to an 6-core i7-10710U with Intel UHD integrated graphics. It is physically identical to the early 2019 XPS 13 9380.

XPS 13 (9300, Early 2020) 

The XPS 13 (9300), like the 2-in-1 7390 updates to the new 10th generation 10 nm Intel Ice Lake processors up to an i7-1065G7, features a new 13.4" inch screen with an aspect ratio of 16:10 and a front-facing webcam supporting Windows Hello facial recognition. Compared to the previous XPS 13 7390, it has a better battery life, larger touchpad and larger keys albeit with slightly reduced travel. It was launched during CES 2020.

XPS 13 (9310, Late 2020) 
The XPS 13 (9310) was released on September 30, 2020 in USA and Canada.  It has the same chassis as the previous generation and features Intel's new 11th generation 10 nm Tiger Lake processors along with support for Thunderbolt 4.

XPS 13 2-in-1 (9310, Late 2020) 
The XPS 13 2-in-1 (9310) was released on September 30, 2020 in USA and Canada along with the 9310.  It has almost the same build as the late 2019 2-in-1; the weight has decreased, at 2.8 pounds from 2.9, and the keyboard layout was tweaked. It features Intel's new 11th generation 10 nm Tiger Lake processors, which use Intel's improved Intel Iris Xe integrated graphics.

XPS 13 (9305, Mid 2021) 
The XPS 13 (9305) uses a 16:9 aspect ratio screen based upon the Intel 11th gen i5 and i7 processors. While similar to the 9310, the 9305 includes an additional USB-C port (3 in total) and utilizes an earlier generation chassis (XPS 13 9370) with a narrower keyboard (2019 era). The 9305 is intended to be a lower cost model; the screen only comes in 1080p resolution and the maximum hard drive and memory sizes are 512 GB and 16 GB respectively.

XPS 13 Plus (9320, Early 2022) 
The XPS 13 Plus (9320) represents the first substantial redesign of the XPS 13 chassis at a $300 higher price point relative to the 9315. The chassis redesign has removed the headphone jack and card reader, leaving just 2 Thunderbolt 4 ports. This redesign features 12th Gen Alder Lake-P Intel Core processors at 28W TDP, a larger 55 watt hour 3 cell battery, and an OLED screen.  It's available in full Platinum or Graphite color. The dual fans are now larger, providing more airflow. A non-programmable capacitive function key row replaces physical function keys in order to widen the hinge points and allow for better cooling. Despite these design changes to accommodate the high 28W TDP, various reviewers have noted noticeable warmth during normal usage. The higher TDP likely also contributes to the lower battery life. The keyboard extends to the full width of the laptop with minimal spaces between the keys with no Delete key. The track pad is now incorporated into the palm rest.

XPS 13 (9315, Mid 2022) 
The XPS 13 (9315) represents a continuation of the 9310 design with a 13.4” 16:10 screen. It features 12th Gen Alder Lake-U Intel Core processors at a lower 15W TDP and a 51 watt hour, 3 cell battery. The chassis redesign has removed the headphone jack and card reader, leaving just 2 Thunderbolt 4 ports. A USB-C to headphone jack adapter is included. It's available in full Sky or Umber color. A single fan is offered for cooling with no air intake grill at the bottom. SSD is no longer upgradeable M.2-based but soldered onto the motherboard.

XPS 14

XPS 14 (L401X) 
This XPS was released in the summer of 2011 and is a 14-inch HD WLED screen with resolution up to 1366×768 (touch screen iCESs optional) bundled in Intel Core i3-360M processor (2.4 GHz, 2Core/4Threads, 3M cache), 4 GiB 1333 MHz DDR3 SDRAM. Its base-price at release is $USD999 and comes with i3 360 m . it can be customized up to the intel core i7 740Qm . It is equipped with a 2011 1 GiB NVIDIA GeForce GT 420M Graphics (for Core-i5 processors) and GT 425M (for Core-i7 processors). It can also be customized with up to 8 GiB of DDR3 memory. The computer can either have a 500 GB 7200 RPM SATA hard drive, or a 256 GB solid state drive. This laptop has a sleek anodized aluminium LCD back cover. It also had World's first camera with Hi-Definition Video Streaming with Skype (2.0MP, H.264 Camera), JBL 2.0 Speakers with Waves MaxxAudio v3.0 enhancement for a 6-Way audio performance, Biometric – Fast Access facial recognition system.

XPS 14 (L421X) 
The XPS 14 was released in the summer of 2012 and is a 14-inch laptop. Its base-price at release is $USD999 and it can be customized up to the third generation Intel Core i7. It is equipped with a 2012 NVIDIA GT 630M (on higher models) or Intel HD graphics 4000 (on the base model), and can be customized with up to 8 GiB of DDR3 memory. The computer can either have a 500 GB 7200 RPM SATA hard drive, or a 256 GB SSD. This laptop is an ultrabook featuring a long battery life (claimed to be 9hours) and a sleek aluminium unibody shell.

XPS 15

XPS 15 (L501X/L502X, October 2010) 
The XPS 15 was released in October 2010 and is a 15.6-inch laptop. Its base-price at release is $849 and it can be customized up to the Intel Core i7. It is equipped with a 2010 NVIDIA GT 435M or 420M video card, and can be customized with up to 8 GiB of DDR3 memory. This made it a good gaming laptop for its time. The base model comes with 500 GB 7200 rpm SATA hard drive, but options include a 640 GB 7200 RPM SATA hard drive, or a 256 GiB SSD. It also contains a 16x DVD/Blu-ray reader/burner, and a 9-in-1 media card reader. The screen resolution is either 1366×768 or 1920×1080. The Nvidia graphics card used in Dell 15 (L501x) turns off or on automatically for specific applications demanding dedicated graphics. It has integrated JBL 2.1 Speakers + Waves MaxxAudio enhancement. It is equipped with 2 MP webcam. It has two USB 3.0 ports and one eSATAp port. The following year the XPS 15 (L502x) had both its processor and graphics card upgraded, with the processor being upgraded from the Arrandale to the Sandy Bridge chipset and the graphics upgraded to either a Nvidia 525M or 540M with 1 or 2 GiB of RAM respectively.

XPS 15 (L521X, Summer 2012) 
The Dell XPS 15 L521X was first released in Summer 2012. Includes a 15.6-inch screen (1920x1080 Corning Gorilla Glass FHD WLED with TrueLife) and was much thinner than its predecessor. Its design was similar to Dell XPS 13 L321X and Dell XPS 14 L421X: the edges are rounded and the bottom is made of carbon fiber, with a gentle silicone surface treatment. It features Intel HM77 Express Chipset with Intel Core i5/i7 (3rd generation, up to i7-3632QM) CPU, from 4 to 16 GiB replaceable DDR3 memory (2 slots), GeForce GT630M / GT640M with 1 GiB / 2 GiB of GDDR5 and one mSATA mini card slot paired with classic 2.5 inch SATA slot.

XPS 15 (9530, October 2013) 
The Dell XPS 15 Touch Screen laptop (9530, using Haswell) was first released in October 2013, is a high-end notebook. It was the fourth generation XPS 15, which has taken many of the design elements of the Ivy Bridge Edition XPS 15 but fixes the cooling/throttling, adds a Haswell CPU and an updated GeForce GT 750M, no optical drive, and a relatively high-resolution 3200×1800 display. The XPS 15 shipped with Windows 8.1. Worth mention is that there are three different models of the new XPS 15 available right now. The base model XPS 15 comes with a 1920×1080 touchscreen display (it is unclear if this is a TN panel or not), 500 GB HDD with 32 GiB msata SSD cache, dual-core i5-4200H CPU, 8 GiB RAM, integrated HD 4400 Graphics, and a 61Wh battery.  A mid-range model has a quad-core i7-4702HQ CPU, 3200×1800 PPS (similar to IPS) touchscreen, 16 GiB RAM, GT 750M GDDR5 GPU, a 1 TB HDD with 32 GiB SSD cache, and a 61 Wh battery.  The high-end edition is mostly the same as the mid-range model but replaces the HDD with a 512 GB mSATA SSD and adds a larger 91 Wh battery in place of the 2.5" drive. There is also higher resolution 4k 3840x2160, slightly better CPU - i7-4712HQ.

The 9530 has been criticized for the instability of 802.11ac Wi-Fi. Currently this model has an issue with respect to an annoying electrical/hissing noise called 'Coil Whine'.

XPS 15 (9550, October 2015) 

On October 8, 2015, Dell refreshed the XPS 15 (9550) with the Skylake microarchitecture.  A 15.6-inch UltraSharp™ InfinityEdge display is included to fit into the body of a relatively small notebook that responds well to standard Windows 8.1 swipes and commands. Edge-to-edge Gorilla Glass NBT covers the screen. The chiclet-keys of backlight keyboard are matte black and feature a slightly concave surface area. This redesigned model offers PCIe SSDs up to 1 TB, up to 32 GiB of DDR4 RAM through two SODIMM slots, GeForce GTX 960M with 2 GiB GDDR5, a 3×3 802.11ac Wi-Fi card, and featuring Thunderbolt 3 through Type-C, though this port is only able to achieve Thunderbolt 2 speeds.

XPS 15 (9560, Early 2017) 

A slightly updated model 9560 was released in February 2017. The new model aligned with the previous model 9550 in terms of dimension and exterior ports, but inside the CPU and GPU were upgraded to Kaby Lake and GTX 1050, respectively. This model suffered from many thermal issues at high work loads, causing the computer to not be able to use all of its power.

XPS 15 2-in-1 (9575, Early 2018) 
The XPS 15 2-in-1 (9575) is similar to the XPS 15 (9560) but with a flexible hinge allowing it to fold over into tablet mode. This convertible laptop features the 8th Generation Intel mobile processors with AMD GPUs integrated into the chip package.  It was announced at CES 2018. This XPS 15 utilizes LPDDR3 RAM, which is soldered and not upgradable.

XPS 15 (9570, May 2018) 
The XPS 15 (9570) is the updated version of the XPS 15 (9560) model. This new model brings options for the new Coffee Lake quad-core Core i5, hexa-core Core i7 and Core i9 processors, with the option for the latter, the eight-core Core i9-8950HK, being clocked at 2.9 GHz, with a boost clock of 4.8 GHz and the ability to be overclocked as well. This new model also comes with an option for the NVIDIA GeForce GTX 1050Ti graphics card, and has the optional fingerprint scanner integrated into the power button. The webcam placement has also been shifted to be underneath the DELL logo on the bottom of the display. The non-touch Full HD variant also now offers 100% sRGB color space coverage on its IPS display, and its Thunderbolt 3 port now supports all four PCIe lanes, unlike the previous models, which only had support for two lanes.

XPS 15 (7590, 2019) 
The XPS 15 (7590) was released with an OLED display option (the UltraSharp 4K Ultra HD (3840 x 2160)). It features 9th Gen Intel Core processors (up to Core i9-9980HK), Wi-Fi 6 technology, and optional NVIDIA GeForce GTX 1650 GPU. It supports up to 64 GiB of memory with a bandwidth of 2666 MHz, as well as 2 TB PCIe SSD storage. Launched on 27 June.

XPS 15 (9500, 2020) 
The biggest changes in XPS 15 (2020) are that Dell goes all USB-C and 16:10 display aspect ratio. The XPS 15 also got a smaller and higher resolution webcam of 720p, and more powerful speakers that aim up out of the laptop. It also got updated inside, including 10th Gen Intel Comet Lake CPU, 
up to 64 GiB DDR4 RAM, up to 2 TB PCIe3 x4 SSD storage, Intel UHD Graphics + Nvidia GTX 1650 Ti GPU. DELL also offers two types of 15.6-inch Infinity Edge display (1920 x 1200 or 3840 x 2400), and two different capacity batteries (56 Wh or 86 Wh). Size: 13.57 x 9 x 0.7 inches, Weight: 4 pounds (non-touch, 56Whr battery), 4.5 pounds (touch, 86Whr battery). That makes it thinner and lighter than the previous version.

XPS 15 (9510, 2021) 
The 2021 XPS 15 comes equipped with up to Intel’s 11th Gen Tiger Lake Core i9-11900H and 3050 Ti. It features up to 64GB of DDR4-3200 and up to 4TB of m.2 SSD storage, but it can be upgraded to hold a maximum of two 4TB SSDs. The XPS 15 offers display options for either a 4K UHD+ (3840x2400) InfinityEdge touch display with a VESA DisplayHDR400 certification, or FHD (1920 x 1200) panels, plus a 3.5K (3456 x 2160) InfinityEdge OLED touch display option. Ports have also been upgraded, the XPS 15 offers two Thunderbolt 4 ports and a regular USB 3.2 Gen 2 Type-C port.

XPS 15 (9520, 2022) 
Dell has updated its XPS 15 laptops with Intel 12th generation Alder Lake chips. The new CPU options include the Core i5-12500H, Core i7-12700H, and Core i9-12900HK. Aside from the CPU update, RAM has been upgraded as well from DDR4-3200 to DDR5-4800. GPU and storage options haven't changed and so users can still configure with PCIe4 x4 SSDs or up to GeForce RTX 3050 Ti graphics if desired.

XPS 15 (9530, 2023) 
Dell has updated its XPS 15 laptops with Intel 13th generation Raptor Lake chips. The new CPU options include the Core i5-13500H, Core i7-13700H, and Core i9-13900H. The GPU has also been upgraded from the previous year offering the Intel Arc A370M and the Nvidia GeForce RTX 4050, 4060 and 4070 options.

Comparison

XPS 15z

XPS 15z (L511Z) 
The XPS 15z was released in May 2011 and is a 15.6-inch laptop. It is branded as the thinnest 15 inch PC on the market. It is noted for having a very similar design to the current generation Apple Macbook Pro computer, and even sported a silver aluminum casing. Its base-price at release is US$999 (A$1399) and it can be customized up to the dual-core Intel Core i7. it is equipped with a NVIDIA GeForce GT 525M 1 GiB video card (Australian version is equipped with 2 GiB video RAM), and can be customized up to 8 GiB of DDR3 memory. The computer can either have a 750 GB 7200 RPM hard drive or a 256 GB solid state drive. It also contains a 8x slot-loading CD/DVD reader/burner. The American version has a base screen resolution of 1366×768, while the Australian release is 1920×1080 pixels. On 6 September 2011, Dell upgraded the choices for the optional extra Core i5 and i7 processors. Throughout its production, the XPS 15z was plagued with DCP latency related sound spikes due to faulty network drivers provided by Dell. The solution was to use third party drivers, as discovered by a community of forum users.  Another chronic issue was the lower right corner of the LCD going dim at random times. Replacement of the entire LCD assembly would only temporarily solve this problem. Production of the XPS 15z ceased in the first half of 2012, but its design was carried on by the XPS 14z. The XPS 15z was marketed as a stylish laptop built with “premium materials” but the overall build quality was poor. The silvering would flake off and the plastic edges would become detached and break off easily.

XPS 17

XPS 17 (L701X) 
The Dell XPS 17, released in October 2010, was a desktop replacement laptop in the XPS Laptop line. It was priced at $949 for the base configuration, but can be customized heavily. Options include a processor upgrade up to the new Intel Core i7-840QM (Nehalem-based), an Nvidia GeForce GT 555 3 GiB graphics card, up to 16 GiB of DDR3 RAM memory, 1.28 TB Hard Drive space (2×0.64 TB @ 7200 RPM), a 17.3-inch 1600×900 resolution screen, and a Blu-ray Disc drive. It also has an LCD upgrade of 1920×1080 (Full HD) and 3D display kit.

XPS 17 (L702X) 
The L702X is quite similar to the L701X, except this model contains the second-generation Intel Core i5 & i7 (Sandy Bridge-based) processors and capability for an FHD Display (Full HD Display) and FHD 3D display. Also, the discrete graphics have been improved to Nvidia GeForce GT 550M 1 GiB or GT 555M 3 GiB graphics card for Full HD 3D Display. The L702X can also be customized with up to 16 GiB of DDR3 RAM (8 GiB × 2) or 32 GiB (4 slots @ 8 GiB) of RAM with the 3D model only Model: HMT41GS6MFR8C (Hynix) Issues have been reported with the charging port and the charger falling out with the only slight movements.

XPS 17 (9700, 2020)
On May 14, 2020, Dell reintroduced a new XPS 17 after almost a decade since the last model.  This model comes with thinner bezels and new thermal designs, It also offers Intel's 10th Generation Core i9 45 W processors, 64 GiB of RAM, and 2 TB of storage.

XPS 17 (9710, 2021)
In May 2021 Dell introduced an updated XPS 17. It now offers Intel's latest 11th Gen Core i5, i7, i9 processors.

XPS 17 (9720, 2022)
In Apr 2022  Dell introduced an updated XPS 17. It now offers Intel's latest 12th gen Core i5, i7, i9 processors.

XPS M1730 

The XPS M1730 was announced on October 5, 2007 as the newest 17-inch XPS laptop computer. Compared to its predecessor, the XPS M1710, the model M1730 was physically redesigned with a completely new chassis available in a grey, white, blue, or red. Like the M1710, the M1730 offered unique user- and software-changeable LED lighting in the touchpad, fan outlets/inlets, as well as the lid and speaker grilles. Also like its predecessor, it featured a 17-inch widescreen. From the components angle, it supported overclockable Intel Core 2 Extreme processors (2.8 GHz to 3.4 GHz overclocked via the X7900 or X9000 Processor), dual NVIDIA GeForce 9800M GTX video cards in SLI, up to two 7200 RPM SATA hard drives available in RAID, and up to 8 GiB DDR2 SDRAM . A Blu-ray Disc Drive was an option in some models. New with this latest version was a built in optional AGEIA physics card to enable PhysX enhanced titles take advantage of hardware accelerated physics, the option for 64 GB solid state drives, a back lit keyboard including a number pad, and a Logitech gaming LCD display above the keyboard.

Criticism 

The M1730 has been criticized for its increase in weight and size compared to previous models, and for having only marginal performance gains in select games. The last complaint is likely due to a late Nvidia release of a mobile version of the 8800M video card which Dell added to the list of options following the release of the M1730.

Upgrades 

Following the initial release of the M1730, the option to have dual 8800M GTX graphics cards in SLI was made available. This is said to have a 174% power increase (as quoted by Dell) over the dual 8700M GTs in SLI which were previously the highest available option. More recently an option to have dual 9800M GT and 9800M GTX graphics cards in SLI has been added to the line.

The 9800M GTX SLI is currently the highest supported graphics card with 1 GiB GDDR3 VRAM for the M1730, as opposed to the 9800M GT SLI and 8800M GTX SLI only with 512 MB of available Video Memory and slightly higher amount of stream processors. Thus, performs slightly better than the 9800M GT and 8800M GTX cards. The availability of the 9800M GTX SLI is rare, and may only be purchased in limited Dell direct outlets and on eBay. And in most cases, they are either out of stock, not on sale any longer or selling the previous 9800M GT and 8800M GTX graphics cards.

XPS M1530 

This 15.4-inch laptop, released on November 28, 2007, features the Santa Rosa platform. The XPS M1530 is almost identical in design to the XPS M1330 except that it has 4 different colors (blue, black, pink and red) and it is a bit thicker and heavier with a 15.4-inch CCFL or LED screen. It can be configured with Intel Core 2 Duo mobile processors up to T7800 (2.6 GHz) / T9500 (2.6 GHz, 6 MiB L2 cache) / X9000 (2.8 GHz), up to 8 GiB DDR2 SDRAM at 667 MHz, up to 320 or 500 GB 5400 rpm or with faster 160, 240 or 320 GB 7200 rpm hard drive or an optional 128 GB SSD, and can be configured with a 128 MiB DDR2 Geforce 8400GS or 256 MiB DDR3 8600M GT GPU. Wireless draft-n is also available (802.11n). The XPS M1530 includes a biometric fingerprint reader and a 2 MP webcam. Another option for this laptop is a glossy 1920×1200 display, even though it is 9 inches smaller than Dell's 24 inch monitor. The system weight starts at 2.62 kg (5.78 lbs) and is dependent upon configuration. The laptop contains an internal slot for a Dell mobile broadband card.

XPS M1530 is no longer available for purchase on Dell's website as of early August 2009. Dell became aware that the problem was limited to Nvidia chip production, the BIOS was updated to A12 which improves thermal control but does not prevent it from reoccurring. The problem associated with Nvidia GPU's was the chip material used could not stand high temperatures.

XPS M1330 

This 13.3-inch high-end laptop, released on June 26, 2007, features the Santa Rosa platform. This 13.3-inch screen either with CCFL or WLED; the WLED-backlit version has a 0.3 MP camera, as opposed to the 2 MP camera with the CCFL screen, but the model with WLED screen is thinner and brighter than the previous XPS 1210 version. Moreover, XPS 1330 can also feature a biometric fingerprint reader, usually found in business class laptops like the Latitude series. The XPS M1330 also offers the NVIDIA GeForce Go 8400M GS graphics card as an option. Originally, it could only be configured with Intel Core 2 Duo mobile processors up to T7700 (2.4 GHz), but could later be configured with processors up to the Intel Core 2 Duo T9500. Noted for its light weight of only 1.8 kg, the XPS M1330 is also available in the product red line along with other Dell computers.

XPS M1330 is no longer available for purchase on Dell's USA website as of early August 2009. It has been replaced by the M1340 (Studio XPS 13).

Problems 

The most reported issue with M1330 laptops has been overheating. Dell became aware of the problem and found that it was limited to Nvidia chip production G84- and G86-GPU's, as a result, the BIOS was updated to A12, which improves thermal control but does not prevent it from reoccurring. The problem associated with Nvidia GPU's was the chip material used could not stand high temperatures. This problem was exacerbated by poor thermal contact between the chip and the heat pipe (the gap is too big). Some people have overcome the graphics chip over-heating problem by fashioning a heat sink using a copper plate and thermal paste to fill the gap between the heat pipe and the graphics chip.

Also, there have been several cases reported involving M1330 laptops to be cosmetically defective in manufacture, such as loose hinge covers and unusually and uneven gaps between plastic parts, as well as customer complaints concerning "CPU whine".

Studio XPS 13 (M1340) 

Similar to the Studio XPS 16 but trimmed down into a 13.3-inch 720p 16:10 aspect ratio screen, it has an illuminated QWERTY keyboard and includes leather accents on the lid. Its full body is piano black and silver.

The Studio XPS graphics offerings are currently the integrated Nvidia 9400M G (same as used in MacBook Air and 13-inch MacBooks) and the more powerful Nvidia GeForce 9500M GE (which is composed of an integrated GeForce 9400M G and discrete GeForce 9200M GS with 256 MB of GDDR3 memory). When configured with the 9500M GE you are able to switch between the 9400M G running standalone and the 9400M G with the 9200M GS in Windows Vista, without logging out and back in like you must with Apple products due to the availability of Hybrid SLI. Although this model is still available in Europe with the 512 MB nVidia GeForce 210M graphics card and the NVIDIA GeForce MCP79MX Chipset.

 Processor: Intel Core 2 Duo P7350, P8600, P8700, P8800, P9500, P9600 or P9700.
 Memory:3, 4, 6, or 8 GiB of shared dual channel DDR3 SDRAM @ 1066 MHz.
 Chipset: Nvidia 730i
 Graphics: integrated Nvidia GeForce 9400M G with 256 MB of graphics memory, or integrated 9400M + discrete GeForce 9200M (referred to officially as a "9500M").
 Display: 13.3" Edge-to-Edge with CCFL-backlit, 1280×800 resolution or 13.3" Edge-to-Edge with LED-backlit, 1280×800 resolution and TrueLife.
 Storage: 1 x SATA (250 GB, 320 GB or 500 GB HDD at 7200 RPM or 256 GB Solid State Drive)
 Optical Drive: 8X slot-load dual-layer DVD+/-RW drive or 2X tray-load Blu-ray Disc Combo drive.
 Battery: 6-cell (56 Wh) or 6-cell (56 Wh) w/additional 9-cell (85 Wh) Lithium-ion battery.
 Camera: 1.3 MP or 2 MP webcam.
 Wi-Fi Card: Dell Wireless 1510 802.11a/b/g/draft/n half-mini card.
 Bluetooth: Dell Wireless Bluetooth Internal 370 (2.1 EDR).
 I/O ports: 1 USB 2.0 port, 1 USB/eSATA Combo port, 1 Gigabit Ethernet port, 1 VGA output, 1 HDMI output, 1 DisplayPort output, 2 headphone jack, 1 microphone jack, 1 54 mm Express Card slot, 1 8-in-1 memory card reader, 1 IR receiver and 1 power adapter connecter.

XPS M1340 is no longer available for purchase on Dell's USA website as of March 2010. No replacement 13-inch Studio XPS has been announced.

Studio XPS 16

Studio XPS 16 (M1640) 
Released early January 2009, it features a 15.6-inch 720p or a 16.0-inch 1080p 16:9 aspect ratio screen. It is equipped with either a 512 MiB ATI Radeon HD 3670 or 1024 MiB ATI Radeon HD 4670 graphics card, an Intel Core 2 Duo processor, a DVD+/- RW or a Blu-ray ROM combo drive, and Windows Vista or Windows 7. It has an illuminated QWERTY keyboard and leather accents on the lid are optional. Its full body is onyx black and silver.

Studio XPS 16 (M1645) 
Same as above, featuring a quad core Intel Core i7 Clarksfield processor on an intel PM55 chipset mainboard and a 1 GB ATI Mobility Radeon HD 4670 or 5730. Some of these XPS systems  were found to have throttling issues when demanding applications like games were run on them. Dell was able to provide a fix for the issue with the help of community input. The fix involved bios updates and a more powerful AC adapter. Other laptops were also found to suffer from the same throttling issue.

Studio XPS 16 (M1647) 
Same as above, featuring a dual core Intel Core i5 or Intel Core i7 Clarksfield processor. The M1647 motherboard still uses the Intel PM55 chipset (as the M1645) but overall the motherboard uses less power than its predecessor.

Gen 3

XPS M2010 
The XPS M2010 was announced on May 31, 2006 as a top-of-the-line briefcase-styled mobile desktop with a 20.1-inch widescreen with a WSXGA+ resolution and TrueLife. The outside of the case had a leather-like appearance. The XPS M2010 used an ATI Mobility Radeon X1800 graphics with 256 MiB of graphics memory and had support for dual hard drives. The laptop could be customized with an Intel Core 2 Duo T2500, T5600, T7400 or T7600 and 1 GiB, 2 GiB or 4 GiB of DDR2 SDRAM @ 667 MHz (Although machine can take 2x2 GiB @ 677 MHz RAM, it will only operate at 3.25 GiB @ 500 MHz due to chipset limitation as well as FSB limitation). The laptop expanded to a full desktop set, including a detachable bluetooth keyboard, bluetooth mouse, and radio-frequency Media Center remote. It was praised for the high quality sound system which included 8 separate ¾" speakers below the screen and a 1¾" subwoofer on the bottom of the machine, ported to the right hand side. While the computer could be folded and carried as a briefcase with its built-in carrying handle, at 18.3 lb it was generally considered too heavy to be a true desktop replacement.

XPS M1710 
The XPS M1710 was announced on April 18, 2006 as a higher-end 17-inch WUXGA TrueLife widescreen XPS desktop replacement available in black or red. The system was marketed to gamers, sharing a chassis design and many components with the lower end Inspiron E1705/9400 and the Precision M90 mobile workstation. The base design featured an Intel Core Duo processor, NVIDIA GeForce Go 7900GS or 7900 GTX, 7200 RPM SATA hard drive, DDR2 SDRAM, a magnesium alloy case including a 1 inch subwoofer complementing the two treble heavy stereo speakers. User configurable multicolor LED lighting was present in the touchpad, fans, speakers and lid with the ability to have them change color/intensity via Dell QuickSet software or via QuickSet plugins to music with bass giving more red-shifted changes and treble more blue-shifted (an SDK developer kit for custom dynamic link libraries could be obtained for integration to many system processes and even games). Technical support was segregated for the XPS line with access to an "exclusive" XPS-branded segment of DELL's business support division. The unit was built on the foundation of a Precision M90 chassis. Later models offered the Core 2 Duo processor, the Nvidia GeForce 7950GTX GPU, and optional Blu-ray and/or an unlocked Core 2 Duo processor, which could be overclocked "officially" to 3.16 GHz, although at least 3.5Ghz has been reported as possible. As the mainboard used the Intel 945 chipset, the XPS M1710 could not address more than 3.25 GiB of RAM though Dell specified "up to 4 GB RAM". This computer was replaced by the XPS M1730. The chipset although capable of AHCI operation was never implemented by Dell, leaving any future SATA hard drive upgrade paths crippled to IDE legacy operation, protocols, and bandwidth. Further evidence of untapped capacity involves the use of replacing the video cards with a Dell Precision Quadro FX 1600M (essentially an 8700M GT with comparable performance to the flagship DX9 7950 Go GTX card), allowing for DirectX 10 functionality in a laptop not designed to do so (with the card being unidentified, but the LCD verified by the BIOS, leaving argument that some design foresight was in place for at least a path to using the Quadro FX 1600 and even FX 3600M in this machine in a BIOS revision).
Note that there are severe overheating problems with the graphics card in this model., and just like the Precision M90, GPU failures due to cracking in the type of solder used on the Nvidia chipsets to bind them to the substrate were common, and settled via a class-action lawsuit with Nvidia in later years.

XPS M1210 
A high performance ultra-portable (12.1-inch screen) notebook featuring a new case design, Intel Core Duo processor technology, an optional dedicated NVIDIA GeForce 7400 Go video card and an optional integrated web camera (1.3 megapixel). The M1210 also has optional WWAN (wireless wide area networking) features supporting 3G broadband services. With the standard battery, the laptop weights 1.9 kilograms. Unlike other 12-inch notebook computers, the M1210 features a built-in optical drive rather than an external. This model was discontinued as of July 31, 2007.

Gen 2 

Inspiron XPS Gen 2/XPS M170 (2005) – This successor to the Inspiron XPS, had replaced the desktop Pentium 4 with a Pentium M processor, which provided almost the same level of performance as the desktop Pentium 4 and reduced the weight from 9.06 lb to 8.6 lb. It featured a 17-inch widescreen display at the same resolution as the first generation. Due to the use of a mobile processor, this laptop was thinner and lighter than most other high performance gaming notebooks of its time. It has a design very similar to the XPS M1710. It was initially given the Nvidia GeForce 256 MiB 6800 Ultra Go GPU which was a Dell exclusive at the time. The laptop was rebranded as XPS M170 soon after the GeForce Go 7800 GTX was incorporated. The Inspiron 9300 was based on it, being substantially the same laptop with an ATI Mobility Radeon X300 in the base model.

XPS M140 (Late 2005) – The lower end model XPS computer that has a chassis identical to a Dell Inspiron E1405 laptop. This model features a choice of several Intel mobile processors, 14.1-inch widescreen and between 512 MiB to 2 GiB of RAM. This model being more media-oriented than gaming currently does not feature a dedicated graphics card. This model has been replaced by the E1405, a 14.1-inch laptop physically similar the M140. It features the newer Intel Core Duo processors and Intel's 945 chipset. It is no longer classified as an XPS laptop, however.

Gen 1 
Inspiron XPS – The first XPS laptop, which was a rebranded Inspiron 9100, was a very heavy desktop-replacement laptop starting at 9.06 pounds without power supply (which added an additional 2.5 pounds). This was because it was offered with either a 3.4 GHz desktop Pentium 4 HT "Prescott" processor, or the 3.4 GHz "Gallatin" Pentium 4 Extreme Edition processor at the same clock speed, which gave off tremendous amounts of heat due to their high clock speeds and inefficient microarchitecture, despite a very large copper-based heatsink that spanned the width of the unit with three fans. Other features included a 1920×1200 15.4-inch LCD, and subwoofer integrated into the bottom of the battery casing, with the 12-cell battery (the 16-cell battery does not include a subwoofer.) Earlier models came with an ATI Mobility Radeon 9700 with 128 MB of memory, and later models with the Mobility Radeon 9800 with 256 MB of memory. The Mobility Radeon 9800 was based on the R420 core, the same as early ATI Radeon X700 and X800 desktop graphics cards, but with half the pixel pipelines disconnected.

A popular modification to the GPU was to bridge two traces in the top right corner of the PCB surrounding the exposed core with a conductive pen to unlock these pipelines. This could only be done on cores made before week 43 of 2004. Dell promised graphics card upgradeability, but only delivered the arguably small 9700 to 9800 step for 9700 owners (at a rather steep $399 price tag, including technician to install it), and never delivered the promised upgrade to the 9800 owners.

This model also suffers from a whine on the headphone and microphone jacks that are located on the left of the unit. This is because of shared space with the leftmost fan, and the spinning of said fan causes interference. There is no known fix than to otherwise use a USB, FireWire/1394 or PCMCIA-based audio device or card for sound output.

Tablets

XPS 10 
The XPS 10 was an ARM-based convertible tablet with a keyboard stand, similar to Microsoft's Surface RT. The tablet, which ran Windows RT, was unveiled on August 30, 2012 and discontinued in September 2013.

Special Editions 
Dell has introduced a handful of "speciality" models which were based upon particular models in the XPS series, but had unique characteristics. These included custom cases and higher-performance parts (processors, video cards, etc.). Some of these models are considerably rare because they were produced in limited quantities and were either extremely expensive or give-away only (as was the case of the XPS X-Men Edition, see below).

XPS 600 Renegade 
The first example of a special edition in Dell's XPS series was the XPS 600 Renegade released in early 2006, which included an Intel Pentium D Extreme Edition 965 processor that was overclocked at the factory from 3.73 GHz to 4.26 GHz. Despite the overclock, Dell honored Intel's warranty for the processor. The case featured an air-brush paint job completed by Mike Lavallee. Most notably, the machine was the first commercially available system to feature a Quad-SLI configuration, with four custom NVIDIA GeForce 7900GTX graphics cards with 512 MiB of memory. It also included a Western Digital hard drive spinning at 10,000 RPM. The XPS 600 Renegade had an introduction price of $9,930.

XPS X-Men Give Away 
In 2007 Dell announced a special X-Men version XPS desktop system that was going to be given away. The system had a value of around $10,000 and featured a one-of-a-kind quad NVIDIA video cards and Intel Pentium 965 Extreme Edition processor. The case resembled a standard XPS 710 series with X-Men artwork on the side.

W.O.W. M1730 

At CES in 2008, Dell announced a World of Warcraft edition of the M1730 laptop. This version of the M1730 cost around $4,500 and featured an overclockable Intel Extreme Edition Core 2 Duo processor, NVIDIA SLI DX10 graphics cards, PhysX card, with a Full HD 17-inch widescreen. It also came pre-loaded with World of Warcraft and Burning Crusade expansion, as well as other limited edition merchandise including a custom backpack.

(PRODUCT)RED 
In March 2008, Dell introduced the XPS RED as a part of the (PRODUCT)RED line of products. A portion of the profits made on this special edition are being put towards research for a cure for the AIDS virus.

Awards 
The Dell XPS 13 and 15 laptops won the COMPUTEX d&i awards in 2016

Dell XPS 15 (9500): Best in Class, Rated 5/5

"The Dell XPS 15 is easily the best 15-inch laptop on the market, and in a lot of ways it's the best laptop period." — TechRadar

Dell XPS 17 (9700): Editor's Choice, Rated 4.5/5

"If you were waiting for a bigger screen with this design, you’re finally getting one (and getting the performance to match)." — Tom's Hardware

Dell XPS 15 7590: The best laptops for 2020

"The XPS 15 is easily the best all-around 15-inch laptop on the market today, making it the ultimate video-editing laptop too." — Digital Trends

References

External links 

 Official Dell XPS Website
 Official Dell E3 Product Page (Requires Flash)
 Dell M2010 US Business configurator – may expire/change
 Dell UK store configurator; different options available. May expire/change
 Dell XPS Generation 2 FAQ. Subject to change

Service manuals 
Dell M1730
Dell M2010
Dell XPS 7590 Service manual
XPS 15 9500 Service Manual
 Dell XPS M1730 product details
 Dell XPS M1330 product Details

XPS
XPS
Consumer electronics brands
2-in-1 PCs
Ultrabooks
Computer-related introductions in 1993